Ecclesfield F.C. was an English association football club based in Ecclesfield, South Yorkshire.

History 
Little is known of the club other than that it competed in the FA Cup in the nineteenth century.

League and cup history

Records 
 Best FA Cup performance: 2nd Round, 1887–88

References 

Defunct football clubs in England
Defunct football clubs in South Yorkshire
Sheffield & District Football League